Sorel-Arthur Kembe (born 5 November 1975) is a fencer from the Republic of the Congo. He competed in the individual sabre event at the 2004 Summer Olympics.

References

External links
 

1975 births
Living people
Republic of the Congo male sabre fencers
Olympic fencers of the Republic of the Congo
Fencers at the 2004 Summer Olympics